Barry Parkhill (born May 11, 1951) is a retired American professional basketball player from Philadelphia, Pennsylvania who was selected by the Portland Trail Blazers in the 1st round (15th overall) of the 1973 NBA draft but elected to play in the American Basketball Association (ABA) instead. A 6'4" (1.93 m) guard-forward from the University of Virginia, Parkhill played in three ABA seasons for two different teams. He played for the Virginia Squires and the Spirits of St. Louis.

In 2001, Parkhill was inducted into the Virginia Sports Hall of Fame.

Playing career

High school
Parkhill attended and played basketball for State College High School in State College, Pennsylvania. He is among the all-time scoring leaders and broke the 1,000 point barrier during his senior year.

College
Parkhill was named the ACC Men's Basketball Player of the Year and the ACC Athlete of the Year for the 1971–72 season when he averaged 21.6 points per game and led the Cavaliers to their second postseason appearance in school history. His number 40 was retired at the end of his senior season.  In 2002, Parkhill was named to the ACC 50th Anniversary men's basketball team as one of the 50 greatest players in Atlantic Coast Conference history.

Professional
In his ABA career, Parkhill played in 173 games and scored a total of 970 points. His best year as a professional came during the 1975 season with the Virginia Squires appearing in 78 games and scoring 607 points.

Regular season

Playoffs

|-
| align="left" | 1973–74
| align="left" | Los Angeles
| 3 || - || 3.0 || .429 || – || – || .3 || .7 || .3 || .0 || 2.0
|}

Post playing career

Coaching
 1977–1978 – University of Virginia, Graduate Assistant Coach (under Terry Holland)
 1978–1983 – Assistant Coach, William & Mary (under brother Bruce Parkhill)
 1984–1987 – Head Coach, William & Mary (Record: 43-68, .387)
 1989–1990 – Head Coach, Saint Michael's College (Record: 9-18, .333)
 1990–1992 – Assistant Coach, Navy

Administration
 1992–1994 – Associate Director of Regional Development, University of Virginia Office of Development
 1995–1998 – Director of Alumni Development, University of Virginia Alumni Association / Director of Capital Projects for Athletics
 1999–present – University of Virginia Associate Director of Athletics for Development

References 

1951 births
Living people
All-American college men's basketball players
American men's basketball coaches
American men's basketball players
Basketball coaches from Pennsylvania
Basketball players from Philadelphia
Navy Midshipmen men's basketball coaches
Portland Trail Blazers draft picks
Saint Michael's Purple Knights men's basketball coaches
Shooting guards
Spirits of St. Louis players
Virginia Cavaliers men's basketball coaches
Virginia Cavaliers men's basketball players
Virginia Squires players
William & Mary Tribe men's basketball coaches